J. N. "Mac" McLaurin was a college football player.  McLaurin was a prominent tackle and guard for the Clemson Tigers football team of Clemson University from 1904 to 1907.

1907
He was captain in 1907, a year in which he was selected All-Southern. "Captain McLaurin has played right tackle this year in superb style. He has never been out of condition , and is one of the most reliable men Clemson has ever had." He weighed 190 pounds.

References

Clemson Tigers football players
All-Southern college football players
American football guards
American football tackles
Players of American football from South Carolina